Wings of Glass is a 2000 Swedish drama film directed by Reza Bagher. The lead roles are played by Alexander Skarsgård and Sara Sommerfeld. The film was entered into the 23rd Moscow International Film Festival.

Cast
Sara Sommerfeld as Nazli 
Alexander Skarsgård as Johan
Said Oveissi as Abbas
Aminah Al Fakir Bergman as Mahin
Rafael Edholm as Hamid
Mina Azarian as Pari
Josephine Bornebusch as Lotta

References

External links

2000 films
2000 drama films
Swedish drama films
2000s Swedish-language films
2000s Swedish films